"Mi Primer Millón" is the second single of the album Caraluna by band Bacilos written by Sergio George and Jorge Villamizar. The song won the Latin Grammy Award for Best Tropical Song in 2003.

Chart performance

References 

2003 songs
Bacilos songs
2003 singles
Spanish-language songs
Latin Grammy Award for Best Tropical Song